The Aiguille du Tour is a mountain in the Mont Blanc massif, located on the border between Switzerland and France. The voie normale on the mountain is graded F (facile) and can be climbed from either the Albert Premier Hut on the French side or the Trient Hut on the Swiss side.

The Aiguille du Pissoir (3,440 m) and the Aiguille Purtscheller (3,475 m) are secondary summits located respectively north and south of the Aiguille du Tour.

References

External links
 Aiguille du Tour on Hikr
 Aiguille du Tour on Summitpost

Mountains of Valais
Mountains of the Alps
Alpine three-thousanders
Mountains of Haute-Savoie
Mountains of Switzerland
Mont Blanc massif